Francis William Martin (May 1, 1933 — February 18, 2007) was a Canadian ice hockey player who played 282 games in the National Hockey League with the Boston Bruins and Chicago Black Hawks between 1953 and 1957. The rest of his career, which lasted from 1952 to 1965, was mainly spent in the minor American Hockey League.

Prior to his professional hockey career, Martin was a pitcher in the Brooklyn Dodgers organization and was invited to attend one of their training camps.

After retiring from the NHL, he began a career as a carpenter for the city of St. Catharines, and played a large role in restoring the Port Dalhousie Carousel. He was also a coach for the St. Catharines Falcons. He and his wife, Josephine, have two children, Sharon and William (Bill), and three grandchildren, William Alexander (Alex), and twins Jessica and Rachel. Frank died as a result of what was believed to be Lewy body dementia.

Career statistics

Regular season and playoffs

References

External links
 

1933 births
2007 deaths
Boston Bruins players
Buffalo Bisons (AHL) players
Canadian ice hockey defencemen
Chicago Blackhawks players
Cleveland Barons (1937–1973) players
Hershey Bears players
Ice hockey people from Ontario
Quebec Aces (AHL) players
St. Catharines Teepees players
Sportspeople from Haldimand County